Timothy L. Terry (born July 26, 1974) is an American football executive and former linebacker who is the director of pro personnel for the Kansas City Chiefs of the National Football League (NFL). He previously spent 13 years in the Green Bay Packers scouting department ending his tenure as an assistant director of player personnel. He also played for the Kansas City Chiefs and Seattle Seahawks. Terry also played one year in the Canadian Football League as a member of the 1999 Grey Cup champion Hamilton Tiger-Cats.

Playing career

College
Terry played as a linebacker at Temple.

National Football League

Cincinnati Bengals
In 1997, Terry was signed by the Cincinnati Bengals after going undrafted in the 1997 NFL Draft. He was mainly on the practice squad.

Kansas City Chiefs
In 1999, Terry was signed by the Kansas City Chiefs. Like in Cincinnati, he was mainly on the practice squad before being released.

Seattle Seahawks
In 2000, Terry was signed by the Seattle Seahawks. Terry retired  from professional football following the 2002 season.

Canadian Football League

Hamilton Tiger-Cats
Following his release from the Chiefs, Terry signed with the Hamilton Tiger-Cats of the Canadian Football League (CFL) in 1999.

Executive career

Green Bay Packers
In 2004, Terry was hired by the Green Bay Packers as a pro personnel assistant. In 2008, he was promoted to assistant director of pro personnel. In 2010, Terry won his first Super Bowl when the Packers defeated the Pittsburgh Steelers 31-25 in Super Bowl XLV.

Kansas City Chiefs
On May 17, 2017, Terry was hired by the Kansas City Chiefs as their director of pro personnel. In 2019, Terry won his second Super Bowl when the Chiefs defeated the San Francisco 49ers 31-20 in Super Bowl LIV. In 2022, Terry won his third Super Bowl when the Chiefs defeated the Philadelphia Eagles 38-35 in Super Bowl LVII.

References

External links
 Chiefs staff page

1974 births
Living people
People from Long Island
Players of American football from New York (state)
American football linebackers
Temple Owls football players
Cincinnati Bengals players
African-American players of Canadian football
Canadian football linebackers
Hamilton Tiger-Cats players
Seattle Seahawks players
Green Bay Packers executives
21st-century African-American sportspeople
20th-century African-American sportspeople